Sofiane Daoud (born 8 January 1975 in Oran) is an Algerian footballer. He played his last season for MC Oran in the Algerian Championnat National of 2008–2009.

Club career
 1993-1997 RCG Oran 
 1997-1998 IS Tighennif 
 1998-1999 SA Mohammadia 
 1999-2002 WA Tlemcen 
 2002-2005 MC Oran 
 2005-2006 Dubai SC 
 2006-2007 MC Oran 
 2007-2008 USM Annaba 
 2008-2009 MC Oran

Honours
 Won the Algerian Cup once with WA Tlemcen in 2002
 Has 7 caps and 3 goals for the Algerian National Team

References

1975 births
Living people
Algerian footballers
Algeria international footballers
Algerian expatriate footballers
Footballers from Oran
MC Oran players
Algerian expatriate sportspeople in the United Arab Emirates
Dubai CSC players
Expatriate footballers in the United Arab Emirates
WA Tlemcen players
USM Annaba players
RCG Oran players
UAE First Division League players
Association football forwards
21st-century Algerian people